Twin Cobra, known as  in Japan, is a vertically scrolling shooter developed by Toaplan and released for arcades in 1987 by Taito in Japan and Europe, then in North America by Romstar. It is a sequel to the 1985 arcade game Tiger-Heli. Controlling the titular attack helicopter, the players must fight endless waves of military vehicles while avoiding collision with their projectiles and other obstacles. It was the fourth shoot 'em up game from Toaplan, and their tenth video game overall. It was ported to multiple platforms, with each done by different third-party developers that made several changes or additions.

Twin Cobra was a success for Toaplan, garnering positive reception from western critics and earning several awards from Gamest. The game was met with mixed response from magazines, specifically the home versions. In 1995, the sequel Twin Cobra II was released. The rights to the game are owned by Tatsujin, a Japanese company formed by Masahiro Yuge.

Gameplay 

Twin Cobra is a military-themed vertically scrolling shoot 'em up game, in which players take control of the titular attack helicopter through ten increasingly difficult levels, each with a boss at the end that must be fought before progressing any further, in order to defeat an assortment of military enemy forces like tanks, battleships, and artillery as the main objective. The title initially appears to be very standard, as players control their craft over a constantly scrolling background and the scenery never stops moving until a helipad is reached. Players have only two weapons at their disposal: the standard shot that travels a max distance of the screen's height and three bombs.

The bombs are powerful weapons capable of obliterating any enemy caught within its blast radius and collecting "B" icons adds an extra bomb stock. A new gameplay addition compared to its predecessor are power-up items that appear via enemy carriers; There are four types of weapons in the game that can be switched between after destroying incoming carriers by picking up color-changing icons ranging from red, blue, green and yellow, while "S" icons increases the helicopter's firepower. Other items scattered throughout the levels such as 1-ups and star-shaped gold medals, which grants a 3000-point bonus by collecting them, can also be picked up along the way. Players are given two lives initially and bonus lives are awarded at certain point thresholds and every point threshold thereafter.

Depending on the region, the title uses either a checkpoint system in which a downed single player will start off at the beginning of the checkpoint they managed to reach before dying, or a respawn system where their ship immediately starts at the location they died at. Getting hit by enemy fire or colliding against enemies will result in losing a life, as well as a penalty of decreasing the helicopter's firepower to his original state and once all lives are lost, the game is over unless the players insert more credits into the arcade machine to continue playing. After completing the last stage as with previous titles from Toaplan, the game begins again with the second loop increasing in difficulty and enemies fire denser bullet patterns.

Development 

Twin Cobras creation process and history was recounted through various Japanese publications by composers Masahiro Yuge and Tatsuya Uemura, both of which collaborated with the soundtrack using guitar and marked the second time Toaplan made use of FM synthesis. Yuge stated that the basic structure for the game was already decided during development of Slap Fight by pursuing the excitement of shooting and dodging, settling on the bomb and shot system, claiming that firing a bomb relieved stress from players, as they wanted to make a game that was fun by looking at and get passionate about it. Yuge also claimed that the word "Kyūkyoku" for its Japanese title derived from a translation of Going for the One, the eight studio album by English progressive rock band Yes, as it was not a popular word at the time and although the Japanese title was initially rejected by then-president of Toaplan, he was determined to implement it. The concept of using a bomb came up during development of Tiger-Heli, where the team questioned how to make a shoot 'em up game  more engaging for players but it was never intended for defensive purposes according to them, as the mechanic was instead implemented to provide an aggressive feeling against enemies on difficult situations, however enemies were made tougher to keep gameplay balance.

Twin Cobra was also, alongside Slap Fight, one of the earliest projects Toaplan made use of game design documents, with both Uemura and Yuge stating that ideas by the team were first written in text using A4 paper before reading it during meetings. Several features were integrated into the project by diverse factors such as items swirling around the screen, which was inspired by a donburi bowl, while the slow speed of the helicopter was due to make the title akin to puzzle games and require a level of strategy. Yuge stated that cooperative gameplay was originally not developed but were requested in doing so after completing the single-player version due to simultaneous two-player titles being "a big trend" in overseas regions and being conscious of the American market, as the game had a realistic war setting. Around five members collaborated with the project on a six-month development period including Uemura and Yuge acting as programmers, as well as three designers. Artist Kōetsu Iwabuchi, who previously worked on Guardian, was responsible for the artwork. Despite being published by Taito, Uemura stated that the publisher allowed them to reveal the project was made by Toaplan. Uemura also claimed the project was influenced by Halley's Comet, as he wanted to portray the feeling of aiming and shooting.

Release 
Twin Cobra was first released across arcades worldwide in October 1987 by Taito in Japan and Europe, as well as Romstar in North America. On 21 November 1988, an album containing music from the title and its predecessor was co-published exclusively in Japan by Scitron and Pony Canyon.

Ports 
Twin Cobra was converted to multiple platforms by various third-party developers including the PC Engine (1989), Nintendo Entertainment System (1989), Sega Genesis (1991), X68000 (1993) and the FM Towns (1994). The PC Engine port, developed by A.I Company, was released exclusively in Japan by Taito. The NES port, developed by Micronics, was first released in Japan CBS/Sony and later in North America by Sammy. The Genesis port, developed by GRC, was first published in Japan by Treco, then in North America by Sega and later in Brazil by Tectoy. On 30 August 1996, Banpresto released a compilation for the PlayStation exclusively in Japan titled Toaplan Shooting Battle 1, which included both arcade versions of Twin Cobra and its prequel, an arranged soundtrack by Uemura and other additions. In November 2019, Twin Cobra was re-released for iOS and Android mobile devices only in Japan by MOBIRIX Corporation under the name Kyukyoku Tiger Classic. A port for Samsung Smart TV platform is also available through a Samsung TV's games panel.

M2 ShotTriggers 
In April 2020, M2 announced a new version of Twin Cobra as part of their M2 ShotTriggers publishing label. It was first announced to be released on the Nintendo Switch but the arcade version was later included alongside the PC Engine, Nintendo Entertainment System and Sega Genesis versions in the Kyukyoku Tiger-Heli compilation for Switch and PlayStation 4 as part of M2's Toaplan Arcade Garage label.

Reception 

According to Masahiro Yuge and Tatsuya Uemura, Twin Cobra proved to be a popular hit for Toaplan, though Flying Shark was "the biggest" hit for them. In Japan, Game Machine listed it on their 1 January 1988 issue as being the fourth most-successful table arcade unit of the month, outperforming titles such as Thundercade and Rainbow Islands: The Story of Bubble Bobble 2. It went on to become Japan's highest-grossing arcade conversion kit of 1988.

Computer and Video Games reviewer Clare Edgeley gave an overall positive outlook to the arcade original.

Legacy 
A sequel, Twin Cobra II, was originally under development by Toaplan but the studio closed down in 1994 until Taito allowed Toaplan offshoot Takumi Corporation to finish work on the project as their first release in 1995, before being ported to Sega Saturn in 1997 under the name Kyukyoku Tiger II Plus. Former Seibu Kaihatsu artist Toshinobu Komazawa claimed that Seibu borrowed ideas from Twin Cobra when developing Raiden. Artist Perry "Gryzor/Rozyrg" Sessions cited Twin Cobra as one of the main influences for Super XYX. The rights to Twin Cobra and many other IPs from Toaplan are now owned by Tatsujin, a company named after Truxton's Japanese title that was founded in 2017 by former Toaplan employee Masahiro Yuge, who are now affiliated with arcade manufacturer exA-Arcadia.

Notes

References

External links 
 Twin Cobra at GameFAQs
 Twin Cobra at Giant Bomb
 Twin Cobra at Killer List of Videogames
 Twin Cobra at MobyGames
 Twin Cobra at The Toaplan Museum

1987 video games
A.I Company games
Arcade video games
CBS Sony Group games
FM Towns games
Helicopter video games
Mobile games
Nintendo Entertainment System games
PlayStation (console) games
Romstar games
Vertically scrolling shooters
Sega Genesis games
X68000 games
Taito games
Taito arcade games
Toaplan games
TurboGrafx-16 games
Video games developed in Japan
Video games scored by Masahiro Yuge
Video games scored by Tatsuya Uemura
Video games scored by Tsukasa Masuko
Aircraft carriers in fiction
Multiplayer and single-player video games